Peter Julian is the name of:

 Pete Julian (born 1971), American long-distance runner and coach
 Peter Julian (born 1962), Canadian politician
 Peter Julian (artist) (born 1952), American painter

See also 
 Julian Peter, Pakistan Army general